Gongchen Subdistrict is a subdistrict in the eastern portion of  Fangshan District, Beijing, China. It borders Wangzuo Town in the north, Changyang Town in the east, Liangxiang Town in the south, Yancun Town and Xilu Subdistrict in the west. It contained 214,622 inhabitants in the year 2020. 

The name of the subdistrict Gongchen came from the historiucal name of the northern city gate of Liangxiang.

History

Administrative Divisions 
In 2021, Gongchen Subdistrict oversaw 55 subdivisions, including 37 communities and 18 villages:

Landmark 

 Haotian Pagoda

See also 
 List of township-level divisions of Beijing

References 

Fangshan District
Subdistricts of Beijing